The Harvest is a 1993 Mexican-American thriller directed by David Marconi and starring Miguel Ferrer, Leilani Sarelle, Tony Denison and Henry Silva. Its soundtrack was played by artists from World Domination Recordings.

George Clooney appears briefly in the film, playing a transvestite; Clooney is also a cousin of the film's leading actor, Miguel Ferrer.

Plot
Charlie Pope (Miguel Ferrer) is a writer who goes to Mexico to write the ending of the plot for a movie. In Mexico he is attracted to a woman, Natalie (Leilani Sarelle). They go together to a beach where when she goes away to swim, he is attacked and wakes up five days later. When he wakes up he discovers that one of his kidneys has been removed. Rather than return he decides to find the "ring" whose members removed his kidney. He begins by tracking down Natalie (whose involvement with the ring he is unsure of). He returns to United States with Natalie. There he is attacked by Noel (Tony Denison) who tells him that the surgery was a failure and they require his other kidney. He learns that Natalie was involved in the ring. When Steve is about to kill Charlie, Natalie intervenes and Charlie is able to kill Steve and turn away the people who have come to remove his other kidney. It seems the end and Charlie is finishing the script when Detective Topo (Henry Silva) comes to meet him and informs him that he has questioned Natalie and she is innocent. Charlie goes out to meet her and sees that she looks identical to the Natalie he traveled with. In the end we hear a telephone conversation between Charlie and his boss (who had sent Charlie to Mexico) and we overhear that his boss has had a kidney transplant.

Cast
 Miguel Ferrer as Charlie Pope
 Leilani Sarelle as Natalie Caldwell (as Leilani Sarelle Ferrer)
 Henry Silva as Detective Topo
 Tony Denison as Noel Guzmann (as Anthony John Denison)
 Tim Thomerson as Steve Mobley
 Harvey Fierstein as Bob Lakin
 Michael M. Vendrell as Vent
 Matt Clark as Hank
 Randy Walker as Border Guard
 Mario Iván Martínez as Alex
 Angélica Aragón as Dr. Emma
 Juan Antonio Llanes as Hotel Clerk
 José Lavat as Doctor
 Jorge Zepeda as Officer Morales
 Alejandro Bracho as Kind Eyes
 David Villalpando as Cabbie
 Guillermo Ríos as Local
 Abel Woolrich as Toothless Local
 Rafael Conde as Lagno
 Dave Galasso as Pock Marks
 Claire Jacobs as Model #1
 Lisa Harington as Model #2
 George Clooney as Lip-Syncing Transvestite
 Salvador de la Fuente as Van Driver

External links
 
 

1993 films
1993 directorial debut films
1993 thriller films
Films about organ trafficking
Films set in Mexico
Mexican thriller films
American thriller films
1990s English-language films
1990s Spanish-language films
1990s American films
1990s Mexican films